Butterfly Kisses is a 2018 found footage horror film written and directed by Erik Kristopher Myers. It stars Rachel Armiger, Reed DeLisle, and Matt Lake, and features Eduardo Sánchez as himself. The film follows a filmmaker who discovers a box of videotapes depicting a disturbing student film project about an urban legend known as Peeping Tom. As he sets out to prove the footage is real, he becomes obsessed, along with the film crew following him.

The film is a deconstruction of the found footage genre, exploring what if films like The Blair Witch Project, The Last Exorcism, or Paranormal Activity were real. The director also considers it a mixture of academic criticism and the real world horror of how far an artist would be willing to go.

Plot

In March 2004, Sophia Crane records her final interview regarding her unfinished documentary about the local legend Peeping Tom, tentatively titled Butterfly Kisses. She requests that, whoever finds her tapes, splice together this interview at the beginning and end of the film, as well as show it to her parents. In May 2015, aspiring filmmaker Gavin York (played by Seth Adam Kallick) has hired a documentary film crew to chronicle his discovery of the tapes, and the research to prove that they are real, in the hopes of this being his last ditch effort to "make it."

Peeping Tom is a supernatural entity called a "Flimmern Geist", or Flicker-Spirit that is summoned by staring down the Ilchester Tunnel between midnight and one a.m. for an hour, without blinking, at which point he will materialize. Once you see him, however, he will always be there, getting closer every time you blink, until he is close enough to give you "butterfly kisses" before scaring you to death. The students opt to set up a camera to record the tunnel for an hour, reasoning that the lens is like an eye and the shutter would cause it to blink. It isn't until they're looking at the footage later that they realize it actually worked.

In his attempts to legitimize these tapes, Gavin is not able to confirm the existence of any of the people involved, including the students and their professor Dr. Wolfe, or any other corroborating information. The only person he's able to identify and interview is Matt Lake, an author interviewed about the local legend by the original team, but he doesn't remember much about the interview, and has no other information to show that they ever existed. In another bid for believers, he presents the footage of Peeping Tom appearing to a local ghost hunting group, The Inspired Ghost Tracking Team, who dismiss the film out of hand.

While going through the footage, the team he hired, headed by actual film's director Erik Kristopher Myers, discovers some audio distortion in the original tapes that is Morse code for "Blink." However, the documentary team is highly skeptical of Gavin's claims. Their questions begin to skew more towards the idea that perhaps Gavin has made this footage himself.

We learn that Gavin has failed in his previous attempts to become a filmmaker, and his relationship with both his wife and son are strained at best. He is unaware of their financial issues, but is so focused on proving that these tapes are real that he ends up pushing everyone away. The team also discovers that the original filmmakers had previously won an award for a documentary where they used an actor to portray a real person, which continues to cast doubt on the "discovered" film.

Gavin goes on the radio and is interviewed by host Mike Jones over Gavin putting up the footage of Peeping Tom on a website. The plan is to drum up interest in the discovered film; however, the program goes awry from the outset, only to be made worse when The Blair Witch Project co-director Eduardo Sánchez calls in to dismiss it as an obvious derivative film. After the interview, Gavin's life continues to spiral apart when he finds a note left by his wife that she's left him after he used all the money for his son's education to fund this film.

Erik and his team find Gavin posted outside the Ilchester Tunnel in an attempt to recreate the experiment using a camera. When the team leaves Gavin to discuss the morality of what they're doing, they're interrupted by someone running across the tracks. They realize Gavin and the camera are missing, but their camera battery runs out while they're standing outside the tunnel.

We see some more footage from the original film, which shows Feldman attempting to best Peeping Tom. He is not successful. However, Erik gets a call that when they analyzed the footage, they could see an image in Peeping Tom's eye that was what he would've seen in the tunnel when the students originally filmed the tunnel and summoned him.

Further validation is found when the audio engineer is able to isolate the Morse Code sound, and when using a program called Iris from iZotope, it reveals the silhouette of Peeping Tom in the audio files. At this point, it is confirmed that Gavin has been missing for nine days.

Erik receives a package from Gavin that contains both a DVCam film, a package to Sophia Crane from Feldman that has Feldman's original notebook, and Gavin's notebook with a hotel keycard inside. The crew shows up to find it abandoned, but with tons of GoPros set up. They also find the box with the original tapes. When one of the crew checks the bathroom, they find Gavin's mangled body in the bathtub, dead from heart failure at 39. They debate the merits of showing the police the tapes or the original footage, and opt not to.

Sophia Crane's footage shows her attempting to not blink. She tells about how she had a dream about the tunnel, and was able to stare easily down the tunnel for the whole hour, until Peeping Tom appeared. However, to her horror, she realizes that she was not dreaming and was in fact at the tunnel, ten miles from her home.

Outside the tunnel, Erik and his team argue over whether or not they have an actual story. His crew argues to ditch the project, whereas Erik argues that they have a compelling story, all the footage and discoveries, and an end in Gavin York's death; that someone else could take all this and run, but it would be stupid not to put it out.

We then see the final interview once more from the beginning. Sophia states that he's right in front of her face, but she's found a way to beat him. She breaks a glass frame and cuts off her eyelids. The film ends with her bloody and screaming, along with the title card:

"Four-Fingered Films has undertaken all reasonable measures to ensure the accuracy of this film's content. If you have any information on the persons depicted, please contact your local authorities immediately."

During the credits, we see Sophia Crane still alive in an insane asylum, seemingly stroking the face of Peeping Tom.

Cast
Rachel Armiger as Sophia Crane
Reed DeLisle as Feldman
Matt Lake as 'Mr. Folklore', author for the Weird US book series
Daniel Furst as Miles Sumner
Eve Young as Dr. Wolfe
Kelsey June Swann as Lilly Pine
Seth Adam Kallick as Gavin York
Eileen del Valle as Amelia York
Kaleo Okouchi as Carter York
Janise Whelan as Eve Hunkeler
Michael Whelan as Bart Hunkeler
Eduardo Sánchez as Self

Production
Erik Kristopher Myers had met Eduardo Sánchez at a sound design panel in 2014. At first, he was not featured in the script at all, but Erik's producer Cork Okouchi convinced him to call him to see if he would appear in the film. Not only did he appear, but he ended up producing, watched multiple cuts of the film, and helped focus the film from three hours to 91 minutes through feedback and positive criticism.

Reception
The review aggregator website Rotten Tomatoes surveyed  and assessed all as positive for a  rating.

It won the award for Best Local Film at the 2018 GenreBlast Film Festival. It also won the Jury Award at the 2018 Silver Scream Famous Monsters.

The film was so successful at spreading its local legend that author Shelly Davies Wygant included it in her book Haunted Ellicott City as an actual local legend. Afterward, director Erik Kristopher Myers contacted her to let her know that he had created the legend and seeded it on the internet under a pseudonym. He was initially worried she might be angry; instead, she said she thought it was brilliant.

References

External links
 
 
 

2018 films
2018 horror films
American horror films
2010s English-language films
Found footage films
2010s American films